The men's team sabre was one of ten fencing events on the fencing at the 1996 Summer Olympics programme. It was the twentieth appearance of the event. The competition was held on July 24, 1996. 33 fencers from 11 nations competed.

Brackets

Rosters

Canada - 10th place
 Jean-Marie Banos
 Jean-Paul Banos
 Tony Plourde

France - 5th place
 Damien Touya
 Franck Ducheix
 Jean-Philippe Daurelle

Germany - 8th place
 Felix Becker
 Frank Bleckmann
 Steffen Wiesinger

Hungary 
 Bence Szabó
 Csaba Köves
 József Navarrete

Italy 
 Luigi Tarantino
 Raffaelo Caserta
 Tonhi Terenzi

Poland - 4th place
 Janusz Olech
 Norbert Jaskot
 Rafał Sznajder

Romania - 7th place
 Florin Lupeică
 Mihai Covaliu
 Vilmoș Szabo

Russia 
 Grigory Kiriyenko
 Sergey Sharikov
 Stanislav Pozdnyakov

South Korea - 11th place
 Lee Hyo-Geun
 Seo Seong-Jun
 Yu Sang-Ju

Spain - 6th place
 Antonio García
 Fernando Medina
 Raúl Peinador

United States - 9th place
 Peter Cox, Jr.
 Peter Westbrook
 Tom Strzalkowski

References

Fencing at the 1996 Summer Olympics
Men's events at the 1996 Summer Olympics